{{DISPLAYTITLE:C15H24O2}} 
The molecular formula C15H24O2 (molar mass: 236.35 g/mol, exact mass: 236.17763 u) may refer to:

 Curdione
 Capsidiol
 DB-2073, an alkylresorcinol antibiotic
 Hernandulcin

Molecular formulas